Marc Bellemare (born 3 May 1956) is a lawyer and politician from Canada.

Background

He was born in Saint-Hyacinthe, Quebec, studied Law at the Université de Montréal and was admitted to the Bar of Quebec in 1979.

Provincial politics
Bellemare ran as a star candidate with the Liberal Party in the Quebec election of 2003. He was elected to the National Assembly of Quebec and represented the Quebec City electoral district of Vanier.

He was appointed to Premier Jean Charest's Cabinet on April 29, 2003 and served as Minister of Justice and Attorney General. Bellemare pushed for harsher sentences for organized crime. He was criticized several times by Justice Fraser Martin for the way he handled a juvenile prostitution case which took place in Quebec City and involved talk show host Robert Gillet.

For several years, Bellemare has been a strong advocate of abolishing Quebec's car insurance law. He tried to convince his colleagues to abolish the provincial no fault car insurance plan that had been established in 1978. The Liberals, who had made the proposed change part of their platform, soon abandoned the idea. Disappointed, Bellemare resigned from his cabinet post on April 27, 2004 and relinquished his seat the next day, lasting less than a year in office.

Mayoral candidate
After months of rumors, Bellemare announced that he would be candidate for Mayor of Quebec City. His announcement was made on March 11, 2004. He also founded a political party, Vision Quebec, which was registered on February 22, 2005. Bellemare ended up finishing a distant third. (See 2005 Quebec municipal elections) Originally leading the 2004 polls with over 80% support in the City of Quebec his support disappeared because when asked about his party finances he stated “ I do not know where the funds are coming from I don’t concern myself with questions of money.” This gave citizens concern and he was resoundingly rejected in the election. He also put forward proposals to save the Agora, an outdoor concert venue in the old port of Quebec city.

An early mayoral election was called in 2007, after the death of incumbent Mayor Andrée Boucher. Bellemare ran and finished a distant third again. He resigned as party leader on December 26, 2007. In 2008, Bellemare unsuccessfully petitioned the Papal Nuncio to Canada for an eventual visit of Pope Benedict XVI in Quebec City. Nonetheless, Bellemare was still listed as party leader on the Quebec Chief Election Officer's web site as of June 2008.

Footnotes

External links
 
CAA Quebec information  about the No Fault and the former modification plans

1956 births
21st-century Canadian politicians
Marc
Living people
Quebec Liberal Party MNAs
Justice ministers of Quebec
Lawyers in Quebec
People from Saint-Hyacinthe
Politicians from Quebec City